Dragon King, in comics, may refer to:

 Dragon King (DC Comics), a World War II-era DC Comics supervillain
 Dragon King, a Marvel Comics character from the MC2 universe and foe of Spider-Girl

See also
Dragon King (disambiguation)

References